The Gymnastics competitions in the 1979 Summer Universiade were held in Mexico City, Mexico.

Men's events

Women's events

Medal table

External links
 https://www.gymn-forum.net/Results/UniGame/Men/1979_T_AA_EF.html Result Table (Inconsistent with the Official Statistics book)
 https://issuu.com/usagymnastics/docs/1979_5septoct US Gymnastics Federation's News (Sep/Oct 1979)
 https://www.gymnastics.org.au/images/national/News/Flickin_Back_Archive/apr_79.pdf Australian Amateur Gymnastic Union's Magazine (Apr 1979)

References
 https://www.fisu.net/site/summer_wug_statistics_1959_2019pdf-en-355582-2.html (Official FISU statistics book)
 Universiade gymnastics medalists on HickokSports

1979 in gymnastics
1979 Summer Universiade
Gymnastics at the Summer Universiade